North and Middle Andaman district is one of the 3 districts of the Indian Union Territory of Andaman and Nicobar Islands located in the Bay of Bengal. Mayabunder town is the district headquarters. The area covered by this district is 3251.85 km2.

History
This district was created on August 18, 2006, by bifurcating the erstwhile Andaman district, which included all three tehsils of Mayabunder sub-division of this erstwhile district.

Geography

Demography
According to the 2011 census North and Middle Andaman district has a population of 105,597, roughly equal to the nation of Tonga. This gives it a ranking of 614th in India (out of a total of 640). Its population growth rate over the decade 2001-2011 was -0.07%. North And Middle Andaman has a sex ratio of 925 females for every 1000 males, and a literacy rate of 84.25%.

Language

Bengali is the most spoken language in North and Middle Andaman Islands. As of 2011 census, Bengali is spoken as the first language by 53.79 per cent of the district's population followed by Sadri (11.06%), Telugu (6.47%), Kurukh (6.17%), Hindi (5.99%), Tamil (5.94%),  Malayalam (3.5%), Nicobarese (0.57%) and others.

Karen people, a Sino-Tibetan ethnic group from Kayin State, Myanmar, numbering about 2000 people are also present in eight villages in the Mayabunder and Diglipur tehsils:

Religion

Hinduism is followed by majority of the people in North and Middle Andaman district. Christianity is followed by a considerable population.

Divisions
The district comprises 3 tehsils, Diglipur, Mayabunder and Rangat.

Economy
As of 2010, the district's chief agricultural products were rice (about 6500 ha), coconuts (3600 ha), rabi pulses (2900 ha), areca nuts (1300 ha), and bananas (650 ha).

See also
South Andaman district

References

External links
North and Middle Andaman district official website

 
Districts of the Andaman and Nicobar Islands
States and territories established in 2006
2006 establishments in India